John Geiser McHenry (April 26, 1868 – December 27, 1912) was a Democratic member of the U.S. House of Representatives from Pennsylvania.

Biography
John G. McHenry was born in Benton Township, Pennsylvania on April 26, 1868.  He attended the public schools and Orangeville Academy.  He became a successful farmer, banker and distiller.  He was the organizer of the Grange national banks throughout Pennsylvania.  From 1897 to 1898 he served as chairman of the Columbia County Democratic Committee.

McHenry was elected as a Democrat to the Sixtieth, Sixty-first, and Sixty-second Congresses.  He had been in failing health throughout 1912, and had not been a candidate for reelection.  He was serving his final term when he died in Benton, Pennsylvania on December 27, 1912.  Interment in Benton Cemetery.

References

Sources

Books

Newspapers.com

External sources

John Geiser McHenry at The Political Graveyard

See also
List of United States Congress members who died in office (1900–49)

1868 births
1912 deaths
People from Columbia County, Pennsylvania
Democratic Party members of the United States House of Representatives from Pennsylvania
19th-century American politicians